The E11 European long distance path or E11 path is one of the European long-distance paths, running 4700 km (about 2900 miles) west-east from The Hague in the Netherlands through Germany, Poland, Lithuania, Latvia to Tallinn, Estonia. It starts in Scheveningen, a fishing community, commercial harbor and spa in The Hague on the Dutch coast of the North Sea. It ends in Tallinn, a medieval Hanseatic town situated side by side with the 21st century city of modern glass buildings, located on the shore of the Gulf of Finland of the Baltic Sea.

The E11 is one of three European long distance paths running East from the Benelux to the Baltic states. In the North, following the German, Polish, Lithuanian, Latvian and Estonian coasts of North Sea and Baltic Sea, the E9 offers a variety of polders, sandy and rocky beaches, dunes, coastal meadows and commercial harbors. In Estonia the route goes along the very seashore for around 100 km, mainly between Haapsalu and Tallinn. But in other places crossing the coastline becomes difficult as it is shaped by numerous capes, peninsulas, wetlands with reeds, floodplains, lagoons and shallow coves, which is why the remaining distance of around 500 km has to be covered via seaside trails, roads and along motor roads. More to the South, the E3 crosses through the long range of medium-sized mountains that links the mainly Belgian Ardennes to the Carpathian Mountains. The E11 takes an intermediate course through the rolling lowlands of Northern Germany and Poland, then goes through the Baltic states. Nowhere on the way to Estonia does it touch a sea (not even the North Sea, as E11 starts in Scheveningen behind the first rows of buildings), but it passes a single medium-sized mountain range, the Harz Mountains in the center of Germany. But in Estonia on the northern shores of Lake Peipus and in some places along the Gulf of Finland it runs along sandy beaches or stony, rocky and sometimes overgrown shores. European long distance footpaths are strictly developed as hiking trails, but almost all of E11 can be travelled on a saddle - be it on a horse or a bicycle.

This article presents an encyclopedic overview of the trail. Detailed information about the routing is found in WikiVoyage. Links to detailed information about the townships along E11 are found in a special group of references at the bottom of this article.

Geology and biology 

Most of the (original, pre-human) landscape along E11 was formed in the last 14,000 years, i.e. in the current Holocene or warmer period since the last ice age. The melting ice in Northern Europe caused huge rivers to carve out wide valleys, whilst the sea level rose significantly and flooded low land. It is known that the river Thames in England was once a tributary of the river Rhine on the continent; Britain was then not separated from the continent by the North Sea. In what is now known as the Netherlands and in the plains of (now) Northern Germany and Poland, rivers began to flow to carry the melted ice towards what became the Baltic Sea (itself also a result of the rising sea level) or the North Sea. These areas are now characterized by low-lying land, marshes, sandy old dunes (now stationary hills) alternating with older layers of peat.

From the Dutch and German border to the Harz, however, E11 passes through a different and much older geological area. It consists of a range of low mountain ridges (such as the Wiehen Hills and the Wesergebirge), created almost 100 million years ago from marine sediments which started to rise. The Harz mountains themselves are even much older (about 300 million years according to academic estimates) and stem from a variety of complicated geological processes. After the Harz, E11 drops back to the estuaries of the rivers in the plains.

Large parts of the E11 cross through forests, for which sometimes considerable detours are made. Open scenery is found in small parts of The Netherlands as well as in Eastern Germany and around the Polish city of Poznań. Nevertheless, the E11 links some interesting cities, such as The Hague, Amersfoort, Deventer, Osnabrück, Goslar, Luther's Wittenberg, Berlin, Frankfurt (Oder), Poznań, Gniezno, Toruń, Olsztyn, Lidzbark Warmiński and Kętrzyn. Lakes and rivers are not uncommon along the trail. The trail can be walked at any time of year,  but the Polish winter is long, with a lot of snow. The highest point of E11 is 514 meters on the slopes of the Harz Mountains, whereas the lowest point is slightly under sea level in one of the polders in the West of The Netherlands.

Apart from getting lost in the vast Polish forests, there seem to be few hazards other than the occasional wild boar or gray wolf, or even a rare Eurasian lynx. It is only at the end of a severe winter season, when the animals are hungry, that extra care must be taken. In the summer, one might tread on a venomous adder and in any season one might be bitten by a rabies infected mammal. The one really big danger, however, is the almost invisible tick as it may be infected with tick-borne diseases, especially Lyme disease and tick-borne meningoencephalitis.

History 

 
In a sense, E11 is the oldest European footpath among the ERA network. There is archeological evidence that messengers and traders followed the range of low hills in what is now Northern Germany, thousands of years ago. Especially after the Middle Ages, the route became a backbone of east–west trade. Pedlars and other travelers preferred the dry and sandy ridge to the swamps to the North and South of it. At present, ramblers feel the same for a different reason: the forested hilltops are more pleasant to walk in than the congested lower areas.

From 1970, a regional hiking trail in Germany was gradually extended into The Netherlands until in 1980 the twin cities Haarlem and Osnabrück could present an ongoing international long distance path from West of Amsterdam to the then internal German border in the Harz Mountains. After the fall of the Berlin Wall in 1989 and the unification of Germany in 1990, the need was felt to extend the trail to the East on a partially new course, partially making use of existing trails in the former East Germany.

Parallel to the extension of the European Union to the East, the E11 was extended over the existing network of Polish local and regional hiking trails.

E11 in The Netherlands (355 km) 

 
The Dutch section of E11 is known as the Marskramerpad ("Peddlers Way"), paying tribute to those who walked through the centuries along the same track. The Marskramerpad links Scheveningen in The Hague over 368 kilometers to the German township of Bad Bentheim. The last 13 km are in Germany, which leaves 355 km for the Netherlands. Like most Dutch long distance trails, the Marskramerpad is managed by Wandelnet, where a detailed guide of the trail can be bought.

The Marskramerpad links some typically Dutch landscapes, such as the wetlands and polders in the West of the country, and the sandy hills and broad river valleys in the Center and East of the country. It also crosses some of the most interesting towns and cities, including The Hague, Leiden, Amersfoort, Deventer and Oldenzaal.

EUREGIO exploits the eastern part of the Marskramerpad and its continuation in Germany (together forming the stretch Deventer - Bad Bentheim - Osnabrück) under the name of Handelsweg.

E11 in Germany (996 km) 

The first 13 kilometers in Germany, through Gildehaus and Bad Bentheim, are part of the Dutch Marskramerpad. In the rest of Germany, E11 follows some old regional trails, a remnant of the Wanderweg Harz - Niederlande (Hiking Trail Harz - Netherlands) and a newly created routing in the former GDR. It crosses former West-Germany on a chain of ridges running from West to East, then passes the Harz Mountains without going higher than 514 meters, and finally gives an impression of the large-scale agrarian enterprises that were founded by the Brandenburg-Prussian nobility in the 17th century, and continued to exist in the form of People's Owned Companies during the GDR. The metropolis of Berlin is crossed from Potsdam through the town centre to Friedrichshagen. E11 leaves German territory on the Oder/Odra bridge linking Frankfurt (Oder) to Słubice in Poland.

Töddenweg and Wittekindsweg (205 km) 

After Bad Bentheim, E11 follows the border between the German federal states (Länder) of Lower Saxony and Northrhine-Westphalia over about 200 kilometers, which means that one crosses their border at least every day. This is true for both the Töddenweg and the Wittekindsweg, which form the respective continuations of the Marskramerpad.

The Töddenweg (a regional name to be translated as Peddlers Way) used to begin in Oldenzaal in The Netherlands, but has its start now in Bad Bentheim, an old siege of German nobility with a medieval castle (partly museum) and a functioning spa. A set of 3 maps can be downloaded or ordered from EUREGIO. A different map can be obtained from the website Spazieren.de. In its present form, from Bad Bentheim to Osnabrück, the Töddenweg measures 110 kilometers. It is marked by stickers with a white capital T on a black square, or by a simple T painted on trees and walls. It cruises slightly elevated above the surrounding agrarian land.

The continuation after Osnabrück's monumental railway station is called Wittekindsweg (Widukind's Way), named after Widukind, an 8th-Century war leader who long upheld the conquest of Saxony by Charlemagne. Remarkable is that his long and brave resistance resulted in his appointment as the first Duke of Saxony under Charlemagne. Just before the sensational descent to Porta Westfalica, the trail passes the giant monument to the honor of Wilhelm I, German Emperor from 1871 till his death in 1888. The building is placed in such a way, that even today, all who pass in a train or on the motorway, see it high on the slope that ends the Wiehengebirge.

Eastern Lower Saxony and Harz Mountains (186 km) 

After Porta Westfalica E11 remains in Lower Saxony for almost 200 kilometers. It follows the 50 kilometers of a regional hiking trail, the Wesergebirgsweg, cruising over de crest of the next ridge, the Weser Uplands to the medieval town of Hameln. E11 reaches a height of 440 meters on Mount Hohe Egge, amidst of breath-taking rocks and ancient forests. It then crosses the open downs around Hameln (junctions with E1) and Coppenbrügge, near the rivers Hamel and Weser. The latter township offers the last possibility for shopping before E11 climbs the next ridge, the Ith and remains on its crest over its full length.

Passing Eschershausen, medieval Alfeld (Leine), the Helleberg ("Mount Hell") and Bad Gandersheim, E11 reaches the Harz Mountains at the township of Seesen. Although the mountain range offers summits of 1000 meters and more (the famous Brocken is over 1100 meters high), E11 does not climb higher than 500 meters and keeps mostly to the lower parts of the northern slopes. It crosses through a few townships well known from early German history: Goslar (junctions with E6) and Bad Harzburg. The little River Ecker used to be the German-German border and now separates the federal states of Lower Saxony and Saxony-Anhalt.

Harz Mountains and Saxony-Anhalt (244 km) 

In the years after the fall of the Iron Curtain and German reunification, the Harz Club put much effort into restoring the network of rambling trails in the Eastern part of the Harz Mountains. This resulted inter alia in a completely new extension of E11 through the federal state of Saxony-Anhalt. It passes Ilsenburg and Ballenstedt, finally breaks through the crest of the Harz Mountains (which are hills rather than mountains here), and reaches the town of Lutherstadt Eisleben, the birthplace of Martin Luther, the church reformer, and bears his name in its official name.

A further extension, long planned, but realized only in 2007, leads E11 through mining and large-scale agricultural country to the Natural Park of the Lower Saale (Naturpark Unteres Saaletal). E11 continues to the city of Halle. This remarkable town survived the Second World War almost undamaged and retains a great number of buildings reflecting Jugendstil, Bauhaus and other architectural styles. The path west of Halle is waymarked in the same manner as the previous parts, i.e. a white cross (X), possibly on a black square.

After Halle, E11 climbs the lonely hill of Petersberg and continues through flat, open land. The scenery reflects both the large scale of agrarian enterprises in the new federal states as well as the influence of Brandenburg-Prussian nobility in the 18th and 19th centuries. E11 reaches the city of Dessau, the cradle of Bauhaus architecture, then plunges into the interesting Biosphere Reserve of the Middle Elbe. It passes Coswig and enters the forest around Senst. Shortly after this village, E11 reaches the border with the federal state of Brandenburg. After Halle, E11 is waymarked according to the traditional system in former communist Europe: three horizontal stripes, white, blue and white, which may also be interpreted as a blue stripe on a white square.

Brandenburg and Berlin (348 km) 

 

E11 enters Brandenburg near Gross-Marzehns and crosses broad treeless agrarian land towards the town of Belzig. The trail continues through vast hunting forests, which were the property of the Brandenburg-Prussian nobility in the 19th century and served as a green belt around Berlin and Potsdam in the 20th century. About 20 kilometers before Potsdam, E11 reaches the first of a score of lakes bordered by many former East German holiday resorts, some of which are still in use. In front of Potsdam's monumental central railway station (Potsdam Hauptbahnhof) E11 meets E10, running north–south and also marked white-blue-white.

 
Crossing Potsdam near the Central Railway Station takes little time as E11 avoids the interesting historical town center and the luxurious palaces of the former dukes of Brandenburg, who became kings of Prussia and emperors of Germany. E11 sneaks through one of the hottest spots on the former border of West Berlin, Klein Glienicke. This little settlement, enclosed by water and divided by an indented border, was packed full of spies by both superpowers during the Cold War. The Glienicke Bridge witnessed the opening and subsequent fall of the Iron Curtain in 1989.

The routing through former West Berlin surprises with a vast area of forest before the Olympic Stadium in Charlottenburg is reached. This part of Berlin is rich in historical castles, including the winter residence of the Prussian kings, who also founded a few museums here. Most of the famous museums of Berlin are, however, found in Mitte (the historical center of Berlin and also the center of the former East Berlin). E11 does not pass here, but follows an old trail in West Berlin along the River Spree and the Landwehr Canal, thus missing the most interesting parts of East Berlin and present-day Berlin.

The borough of Köpenick is where E11 enters former East Berlin. E11 lingers leisurely between the River Spree and a few recreational parks and then crosses the river by ferry into a vast area of town houses and bungalows to Friedrichshagen. Here, E11 leaves the urban area behind to venture to the North into one of the most beautiful parts of the trail, the valley of the little river Erpe or Neuenhagener Mühlenfließ. Turning East, the trail now passes through Neuenhagen and the Märkische Schweiz Nature Park to Gusow near the town of Seelow. From here, the rambler may choose a more western trail over the hills of Lebus to Jacobsdorf or, more to the East, the trail that, after the village of Reitwein, follows the River Oder to the South. Both variants meet each other in Frankfurt (Oder),  where the German part of E11 ends on the bridge over the Oder to Poland.

In Brandenburg and Berlin, E11 is marked in various ways. This part of E11 is described in the German language, A list of 150 addresses which offer lodgings for the night en route, also in German, is found in specialized bookshops in Germany. Some useful information is found at Fernwege.de, but as such not enough to follow the trail. It is strongly advised to carry a city plan of Berlin when walking from Potsdam to Neuenhagen. Locally bought topographical maps will do for the rest of the trail in Brandenburg.

E11 in Poland (1177 km) 

 
 
In Poland, E11 continues east, then northeast, to pass the cities of Międzychód, Poznań, Gniezno, Toruń, Brodnica, Iława, Olsztyn and Gołdap to the township of Ogrodniki, Sejny County on the Lithuanian border. As 30% of Poland is covered with forest, it is not surprising that most of E11 crosses through vast areas with trees (mostly planted and exploited commercially), and various wild areas, such as lakes and dunes. Near Poznań, however, the rambler walks for days through agrarian and semi-industrial land, made pleasant by some ancient towns and buildings. As Poland is rather thinly populated, ramblers without tents must be prepared for daily distances between 25 and 35 kilometers.

No Polish regional trail is, as a whole, part of E11. The trail rather jumps from one existing trail to another, generally after following such a trail for only a short distance. Moreover, E11 is not itself waymarked on the route, with a few exceptions which may amount to one sign every 100 km. The regional trails are marked, however, although not always well enough to enable the rambler to follow E11 without a map.

Some topographical maps show sections of E11, but others may only show the trails that form the basis of it. So one must fall back on documents describing which sections of which trails make up E11. Unfortunately, these are hardly accessible or are incomplete:
A German book, now out of sale, and summarizing the routing of all eleven European long distance paths.
A series of Polish topographical maps (with legend in English) showing hiking trails, but not always indicating which of these belong to E11. These and some more detailed maps may be ordered from abroad at the specialized map shop Grupa.18 in Poznań.
Later changes in the Polish routing can be found (in Polish) in the offices of PTTK, the Polish tourist organization. and (in English) at the secretariat of the European Ramblers' Association in Prague.
Most - but not all - of the trail is correctly mapped on OpenStreetMap and its derivatives (such as Waymarked Trails)

Oder bridge - Międzyrzecz (141 km) 

 
 

Once the bridge across the River Oder (and the now open border between Germany and Poland) has been passed, E11 (here unmarked) goes straight through the town center of Słubice, until 1945 a suburban part of Frankfurt (Oder) under the name of Dammvorstadt, but a separate township in a different country since then. Two kilometers out of town, E11 curbs left toward the little village of Drzecin, where the first white-yellow-white markings are found. These lead in a few days to Lubniewice, where the markings change to white-blue-white. The blue trail passes Kursko and leads to Kęszyca Leśna, a former army base of the Soviet Red Army that now tries to build up a second life as an industrial and tourist settlement. The former staff quarters now function as a hotel, where the hiker may rest as a Soviet general. A little further lies Kęszyca, where a German system of underground corridors and strongholds can be visited. This dates back to 1928, when democratic Germany (the Weimar Republic) felt the need to defend itself against a possible attack from the East with a so-called Ostwall. In 1938 already, this defense system started to deteriorate as dictator Adolf Hitler was more interested in attacking himself to the East and saw no need for a defense system that, from his point of view, lay somewhere inland in his dreamed Great Germany. The spot offers now the unique possibility of following E11 underground.

The blue trail carries E11 on to the township of Gościkowo, where the Paradyż Abbey sometimes hosts tired ramblers overnight, provided they accept the sober rules of monk life. After Gościkowo, white-green-white marks lead through some 30 km of forest to Bobowicko. Actually, between Kursko and Bobowicko, E11 follows a large bow around the city of Międzyrzecz. The city has bus and train connections with various townships on E11 and may be used as a pleasant station for two or three days of walking without much luggage. Bobowicko is at walking distance (2 km) from the train and bus stations of Międzyrzecz. Due to its train connections to Poznań and Germany, Międzyrzecz is also a good place to end or start a tour of one or more weeks along E11. The city has an interesting regional museum and a lively score of restaurants and bars.

Międzyrzecz - Poznań-Kiekrz (133 km) 

From Bobowicko, the green trail continues till after Stołuń, where E11 begins to follow white-blue-white to Villa Toscana, a lonely hotel between the villages of Nowe Gorzycko and Stare Gorzycko. The blue trail and E11 continue to the twin cities of Międzychód and Bielsko, which offer many opportunities for shopping (fashion, antiquities, arts) and staying overnight. E11 now enters the area that, for a long time, was No Man's Land and War Front Zone between Prussia (later the German Empire) and Poland. Many monuments remind of this tragedy, but unfortunately the explanatory texts are in Polish only. In Bukowar the markings change to white-red-white and in Obrzycko to white-green-white. Słopanowo marks the end of the forests; E11 now enters the agrarian open space of the province of Greater Poland around the city of Poznań. There are no marks after Szamotuły. The village of Kiekrz is where E11 reaches Poznań.

E11 through Poznań (33 km) 

From behind the railway station of Kiekrz, a white-green-white marked trail leads through a vast city park to Golęcin, from where a few black or blue marks guide the rambler to the tramway stop of Sołacz and Nad Wierzbakiem. After this point, E11 is not defined, but the obvious choice of a rambler interested in one of the oldest, biggest and most beautiful town centers along E11 is to turn right (South) toward Rynek Jezycki. Here begins The Royal-Imperial Route in Poznań which, in a more or less straight west–east line, passes all tourist highlights of Poznań. This tourist trail ends at the medieval little Church of St. John of Jerusalem Outside the Walls near Lake Malta. The quiet Northern shore of this Jezioro Maltańskie offers interesting views of the many sports accommodations on and around the lake and guides the E11 rambler to the zoo and the start of the well-marked but curving Cistercian bicycle track. Lodgings and buses back to town are found just across the border of the city in Gruszczyn. The last residential area of Poznań is Zieliniec.

Poznań-Zieliniec - Gniezno (55 km) 

Crossing the main road in Gruszczyn, E11 goes straight, in line with Map N-33-131/132, to Pobiedziska. E11 passes over a tar road through a nondescript area of small businesses and workshops related to agriculture. Later, it ventures into forest until finally all black or green markings leave the path and die somewhere in the forest and the dunes. One should rather follow the nearby tar road to the North, to the township of Pobiedziska, where E11 is found back. Away from the track, to the West of the town, open-air museum Skansen welcomes visitors with miniature copies of buildings from a wide area.

 
 
In Pobiedziska itself, the Ulica Gnieźnieńska at the left of the church on the central square of Pobiedziska carries E11 out of town. Through open, mostly agrarian land, the scattered houses of Lednogóra are reached, where white-red-white markings join the trail. This is from now on the colour of E11 over more than 100 kilometres. Along a swampy lake and a crossing in the main road #5 (at the crossing a road sign says that it is now 22.2 kilometres to Gniezno), E11 reaches the railway station of Fałkowo, which is crossed at full length. Here E11 has been forced to make place for a motorway. After Leśniewo scarce white-red-white signs can be found again, leading the aware and persistent rambler to Gniezno.

Gniezno was the first capital of Poland, way back in the Middle Ages, but it is now dreaming away as a provincial town. Old and beautiful houses and other buildings around the central square testify of an interesting past, whilst decaying factories refer to the recent communist past. The university offers the most lively corner of the town. The white-red-white marks of E11 lead along the most interesting churches, museums and other sites, and finally to the railway station.

Gniezno - Toruń (136 km) 

 
A few signs in front of the railway station of Gniezno indicate distances along the red-marked trail that is E11. The 40 km to Mogilno are correct, but the distance to Kruszwica is severely exaggerated. The trail follows the road parallel to the tracks to the Northeast and turns then right into a tunnel under the railway. After another right turn, it passes through a modern industrial area, older residential quarters and a surprisingly wild patch of forest. The red markings lead through open agrarian land to the long-stretched industrial village of Trzemeszno. The trail passes in front of the railway station, crosses the tracks a little further, and reaches Mogilno via the village of Wydartowo. The white-red-white stripes die out in Mogilno. E11, now invisible, turns right in the little park around the lake, not far from the railway station, and immediately right again, to follow the waterside toward the medieval Benedictine monastery. E11 turns left (East) to the lonely motel of Goryszewo Kwieciszewo, where the first white-red-white stripes since Mogilno are found. The trail passes through Jeziorki and follows a sandy dirt road to Strzelno.

After Strzelno, a Polish Way of St. James follows more or less the same route as the E11, so that the yellow and blue shells yield an alternative marking to reach Polanowice. In this soviet-industrial village two rusty signs with white-red-white stripes are found, which still clearly indicate E11 (200 km after the previous E11 sign). A rustic tree lane brings the rambler to Kruszwica, a provincial town with some interesting churches, but no clue where E11 and the Way of St. James continue. Gorges invites to look for a trail marked blue, but the only blue trail to be found makes a short circuit through a suburb of Kruszwica. A better bet is to follow the busy main road to the North, which is marked with the shells of St.James. After 7 km, near Łojewo, one may take a quiet asphalt road, soon unpaved and marked blue. The blue signs lead finally through long-stretched suburbs to the city center of Inowrocław.

Near the railway station of Inowrocław a torn map of the city is found, which indicates where the red-marked E11 leaves the town. The insufficiently marked trail crosses the fields of Kolonie Szadłowice and enters the forests of Błoto Ostrowskie. Finally, one comes to the village of Wierzbiczany, from where both the red markings and the blue shells of St.James lead through agrarian land to the center of Gniewkowo. They follow a right curve and leave the town on the asphalt road towards Cierpice to the North. The trails now enter a large forest, leave the tar road after some kilometers and make a wide curve of 16 km to the village of Cierpice, the first of a chain of suburbs of Toruń. In spite of Gorges, E11 no longer passes through Suchatówka. The blue trail ends at the PTTK office in the town centre of Toruń.

Toruń - Brodnica (87 km) 

 
From the PTTK office in Toruń, E11 is identical to a trail marked white-yellow-white, which leads all the way to Samborowo, 200 km to the Northeast. E11 and St. James Way avoid the historical town center of Toruń and pass between the old city walls and the river Wisla, but it is far more interesting to cross the city center from the PTTK office by Różana, Szeroka and Wielkie Garbary to the train station of Toruń-Miasto. Out of town, the trails follow a main road till Fort Sobieskiego. They turn right into the forest near the river Wisla, enter suburbs and later pass through forest for a couple of hours. After crossing the busy motorway A10 near Brzozówka, E11 turns left into an overgrown footpath between fields and later reaches Mierzynek over a sandy road. From Lelitowo to Ciechocin and again to Golub-Dobrzyń, E11 continues through a variety of natural and commercial forests along the river Drwęcą.

 
 
E11 leaves the twin cities without markings near the Post Office and the cemetery on National Road # 534. The trail follows roughly the river Drwęcą to the North-East, and the first yellow signs are found in the forest. The trail then alternates between river side woods and agrarian settlements. Some of these remind of the composer Chopin who spent holidays in this area and now has a museum in Szafarnia. In Radziki Duże E11 turns left over a paved road with heavy lorries carrying loads from a sand quarry. It takes about an hour to reach a bridge over the Drwęcą and escape from the road into the forest on the other side of the river. This sandy forest road continues till Mszano, but in a new suburb under Szabda it turns into a paved road and subsequently a main road leading to Brodnica.

Brodnica - Olsztyn (237 km) 

E11 and St. James Way leave Brodnica well-marked, but avoiding the nice but neglected old city centre. The trails follow Motorway A15 and an abandoned railway track into forest, and meets the A15 again near the bridges of Tama Brodzka. Right after the bridge, the trails turn left into a small paved forest lane leading to Bachotek, where they split. E11 makes a few curves near Jezioro Zbiczno and meets a trail marked green. Here the yellow signs are missing, but the green signs must be followed to the North until a paved road. The asphalt is followed to the East over about one kilometer between two lakes. Here the green trail and the yellow-marked E11 split up. E11 passes twice near the tourist resort of Ciche and turns West to Górale, then North to the railway station of Ostrowite, and finally East.

 
 
The yellow-marked E11 continues to the East until Radomno, where it unites with St. James Way and turns North to Iława. They pass the modern center of the city, which was heavily destroyed in the Second World War, and continue North by Szalkowo to Tynwald, then East to Samborowo. From here a blue-marked section of E11 leads to Waplewo, passing the forested tourist resort of Wysoka Wieś and the historical site of the Battle of Grunwald (1410).

Between Waplewo and Olsztyn, E11 makes a long half-circle through two natural reserves. The first protects the springs of the Łyna River, which E11 then begins to follow all the way through Olsztyn to Lidzbark Warmiński. A little further down is the conservation area of Las Warminski, which is especially interesting. It shows the results of decades of minimal management, with nature returning to its course before mankind settled in the area. Rare species may be encountered here, including the Eurasian lynx, according to a local signpost.

Olsztyn - Gołdap (243 km) 

 
The historical city center of Olsztyn with its variety of museums, restaurants, theatres and hotspots for night life is without doubt a place where even the most fanatic E11 rambler wants to spend a day of rest. It is the gateway to the former coreland of the Teutonic Order, now characterized by little towns with remnants of huge castles. Of these, E11 passes Dobre Miasto, Lidzbark Warmiński, Bisztynek, Reszel and Kętrzyn. Other buildings remind of the more recent, but also Roman Catholic past, for example the Palace of the bishops of Warmia at Smolajny, the monastery of Stoczek and the shrine of Święta Lipka.

Gołdap - Lithuanian border (144 km) 

In Gołdap, E11 offers a choice between a trail marked white-green-white that comes very close to the Russian border, or a white-red-white trail along the main road to the East. Both trails meet again after 31 km in Stanczyki. The green trail passes through uninhabited woodland and should not be recommended to ramblers with a weak sense of orientation, or those who fear Russian red tape when crossing the border unintentionally and without visa. That one reaches the Russian border before Lithuania, may be surprising to those who are not aware that Russia has an exclave around Kaliningrad, formerly German Königsberg.

E11 in Poland ends at the Polish-Lithuanian border post at 3 km from Ogrodniki. Here is no possibility to spend the night, the nearest lodgings are found in Sejny, 11 km along the main road, or 13 km by following the black trail back and then the red trail to the right. Those who venture into Lithuania may find a guesthouse in Lazdijai. Both towns have no train connections; to take a train home or to an airport, one may follow the red trail from Sejny over 25 km to the railway station of Trakiszki near Puńsk. There are also railway stations in the Polish city of Suwałki and the Lithuanian city of Šeštokai. Be prepared to wait long; there seems to be only one train in either direction from these places except Suwałki that offers three trains daily to Białystok.

E11 in Lithuania (747 km) 
The Lithuanian part of E11 is known as "Miško takas" (“Forest Trail”). It starts at Polish - Lithuanian border near the town of Lazdijai in Lithuania and passes through Dzūkija National Park and Žemaitija National Park and eight regional nature parks in Lithuania. The total length of the route in Lithuania is 747 km and it is divided into 5 sections: Dzūkija ethnographic region, Along Nemunas river loops, Kaunas and Kaunas District, Along the banks of the Dubysa river valley, Žemaitija ethnographic region. These sections are divided into ~20 km long stages with accommodation and transport options.

There are specific markers (white-orange-white) on trees and other objects along the route to help you get your bearings in nature and not lose track of the road. In populated areas, it is marked by stickers on road signs and other objects. The Forest Trail can be started from any physically available location and it can be hiked in both ways (there are markers in both directions).

Dzūkija ethnographic region (140 km) 
The most forested area of Lithuania (Lazdijai (Polish/Lithuanian border) - Nemunaitis, day 51 - 56)

The Dzūkija landscape was shaped by a glacier more than 10,000 years ago. The Forest Trail passes through a vast, sparsely populated woodland and small villages along forest roads. Features and traditions of Dzūkija ethnographic region have been shaped by the forest. People’s occupation and the traditional lifestyle are linked to the forest. Since ancient times, they have been going to the woods to pick and later sell mushrooms. Hence there is the saying of the people of Dzūkija: "If not mushrooms and berries, the girls of Dzūkija would be naked”. The resort of Druskininkai has evolved thanks to springs of salty natural mineral water. The name of the town originates from the Lithuanian word druska — salt. The town of Merkinė, at the confluence of the Merkys and the Nemunas, is among the oldest settlements in Lithuania. In this region, the Forest Trail passes through Dzūkija National Park.

Highlights: Dzūkija forests - rich in mushrooms and berries, blossom of yellow dwarf everlasts, swimming in clear lake-waters, Druskininkai resort town and salt water springs, spectacular landscapes of Sūduva and Dzūkija Uplands, Dzūkija National Park — an intact area where people live in harmony with nature, ethnographic villages with wooden building, hive trees and craft traditions.

Along Nemunas river loops (111 km) 

Ancient pinewood of Punia, spectacular riverside slopes and mineral water resort (Nemunaitis - Pakuonis, day 57 - 61)

The Forest Trail meanders along the wooded banks of the Nemunas through Nemunas Loops Regional Park (Nemuno kilpų regioninis parkas). In the stretch of the Nemunas between Alytus and Pakuonis, where the river forms several large loops with outcrops up to 40 m high, exceptionally picturesque landscapes abound. Nemunaitis, like a majority of Lithuania’s small villages, features an impressive brick-and-stone church, while Alytus Castle-mound inhabited by ancient Lithuanians dates back to as early as the 14th century. Today Alytus features the tallest pedestrian bridge in Lithuania and recreational parks. Birštonas, a resort town on the right bank of the Nemunas, is a popular mud therapy resort with springs of medicinal mineral water. At Birštonas, visitors can treat themselves with mineral water for free at specially designed public places.

Highlights: The tallest pedestrian bridge in Lithuania in Alytus, green parks of the Alytus town, Nemunas Loops and spectacular outcrops on the riverbanks, resort of Birštonas and mineral water springs, parks and recreational zones of Prienai town, tall castle-mounds and churches on the riverbanks, wooden crucifixes and chapels on the roadside.

Kaunas and Kaunas district (79 km) 
Picturesque towns surrounded by greenery and interwar architecture at the confluence of two rivers (Pakuonis - Vilkija, day 62 - 66)

Kaunas, one of the most beautiful Lithuanian cities, is located at the confluence of the Nemunas and the Neris. It is Lithuania’s second largest city, the capital of the former Kovno Governorate of the Russian Empire (1842–1915) and the interim capital of Lithuania (1919–1940). Panemunės šilas is the largest park in Kaunas, with beaches on the bank of the Nemunas, bicycle lanes and footpaths. Lampėdis quarry (125 ha) used to be a gravel extraction site. Its banks serve as a popular recreational and bathing area for townspeople.  Making a loop through the resort town of Kulautuva, a footpath and a bicycle lane stretches along the Nemunas as far as to Vilkija and offers beautiful views over the river. On the way to Vilkija, a diverse landscape with small settlements, castle-mounds and forests can be enjoyed.

Highlights: Kauno Marios Regional Park with the unique landscape of the embankment complex and rock outcrops, modernist architecture of 1919–1940 in Kaunas — the European heritage, forests and parks of the city of Kaunas, blossoming meadows on the banks of the Nemunas, Kulautuva — a popular resort with pine forests, green parks and a sandy beach, ferry across the Nemunas at Vilkija — a live witness of by-gone times.

Along the banks of the Dubysa river valley (141 km) 
Multicoloured meadows of Lithuania’s most picturesque river valley (Vilkija - Dengtiltis, day 67 - 72)

For a-day-and-a-half walk, the Forest Trail passes through Dubysa Regional Park (Dubysos regioninis parkas), where castle-mounds, historical churches and other testimonies of culture and history dot the riverbanks. The Dubysa is a beautiful river favoured by nature lovers because of its rapid flow. The Dubysa is shallow, water in the river is clear, and campsites and camps have been established on its sandy banks. The Forest Trail passes through the historic settlements of Betygala, Ugionius and Šiluva and finally reaches Tytuvėnai Regional Park. The most valuable natural asset of the park is lakes surrounded by wetlands — an important habitat for many animals and birds, including thousands of cranes. The town of Tytuvėnai is renowned for the Baroque-style Bernardine monastery and church, built in the 17th century. Šiluva is an important Catholic-pilgrimage site.

Highlights: rapid and clear waters of the river Dubysa and the deep valley, fortified castle-mounds and wooden crosses in Dubysa Regional Park, tallest and longest railway bridge in Lithuania, Šiluva — place of one of the first apparitions of Virgin Mary in Europe (1608), Tytuvėnai Regional Park — a land of lakes and forests, Tytuvėnai Monastery — among the most beautiful pilgrimage destinations in Lithuania.

Žemaitija ethnographic region (276 km) 
Through Žemaitija upland (Dengtiltis - Lithuanian/Latvian border, day 73 - 86)

The Forest Trail passes through Kurtuvėnai, Varniai and Salantai Regional Parks and Žemaitija National Park, presenting the natural and cultural heritage of Žemaitija ethnographic region. The Forest Trail opens a view on a hilly and wooded landscape, dotted with lakes, rivers, streams, swamps and springs. More than a half of the Žemaitija National Park area is covered in forest, mainly thick and dark fir forests and natural, old coniferous and mixed forests, while the open areas feature meadows. Forests and hills conceal what once was human settlements and castle-mounds. The forest trail passes through the unique villages and towns of Žemaitija where people have preserved their dialect, customs and traditional holidays (Shrove Tuesday, Midsummer Night).

Highlights: Kurtuvėnai Regional Park — a land of forests, including intervening fishing ponds and small lakes, landscapes of Žemaitija and views from the queen of the Lithuanian hills – Šatrija, Telšiai — town on seven hills by Lake Mastis, Žemaitija National Park where the largest and deepest lake in Žemaitija - Plateliai Lake - surrounded by forests and swamps, Žemaičių Kalvarija — pilgrimage destination where the Roman Catholic festival dedicated to St. Mary takes place every year, Mosėdis — a town of stones with a unique display of boulders, Žemaitian dialect, customs and traditional festivals.

E11 in Latvia (674 km) 
The Latvian part of E11 is known as "Mežtaka" (“Forest Trail”). It goes through Rietumkursa Upland, Venta Valley Nature Reserve and Abava River Valley Nature Park, Kemeri National park and Gauja National park, Northern Gauja and Veclaicene protected landscape area. The total length of the route in Latvia is 674 km and it is divided into 9 sections: South Kurzeme region, Kuldīga and surroundings, Abava river valley, Tukums and Ķemeri National park, Jūrmala and Rīga, Riga and Pieriga, Gauja National Park, Northern Gauja Forestland, Veclaicene Forestland. These sections are divided into ~20 km long stages with accommodation and transport options. Most of the route leads on forest roads and trails, about a third on gravel roads. Only a small part of the route, which is outside the big cities, leads on asphalt roads. Some parts of the Forest Trail in Kemeri and Gauja National Parks coincide with already exciting hiking trails and other tourist routes.

There are specific markers (white-orange-white) on trees and other objects along the route to help you get your bearings in nature and not lose track of the road. In populated areas, it is marked by stickers on road signs and other objects. The Forest Trail can be started from any physically available location and it can be hiked in both ways (there are markers in both directions).

South Kurzeme region (111 km) 
Along the hills and river valleys of Rietumkursa Upland (Lithuanian – Latvian border – Snēpele, day 87 - 91)

Southern Kurzeme is also referred to as Leišmale — the area next to the Lithuanian border. The landscape features no old homesteads or villages, as they were destroyed in World War II, and the area around the Forest Trail is dominated by agricultural landscapes sparingly interspersed with wooded areas. The Swedish Gate in Priekule, built in 1688, adorned with the ducal coats of arms of the von Korff and von Redern families, chiselled in sandstone from Gotland, as well as the 18–19th century historical buildings in Aizpute, are testimonies of by-gone times.

Highlights: panoramic views of Rietumkursa Upland, spectacular gravel quarries at Gramzda, cultivated cereals fields and buckwheat fields in blossom, deep and cool Ruņupe Valley, landscape of Kazdanga Park and ponds, delicious cheese of Kazdanga, historical wooden architecture of Aizpute, wine-making traditions of Aizpute.

Kuldīga and surroundings (53 km) 
Charm of the old town of Kuldīga and the widest waterfall of Europe (Snēpele - Renda, day 92 - 93)

In the 16–17th century, Kuldīga served as the residence of Duke Jacob Kettler of Courland (Kurzeme) and Semigallia (Zemgale). During his 40-year reign, the Duchy saw an economic boom. Cobbled streets of Kuldīga, old buildings, the river Alekšupīte, running through the town, St. Catherine’s Church and organ music concerts in it, gourmet restaurants and a country delicatessen shop in the town centre is a great travel experience to enjoy in a leisurely ambience of a small town. The red-brick bridge over the river Venta is a landmark of the town. The widest waterfall of Europe, Ventas rumba (width 100–110 m) lies on the Venta. Since it is only about 1.6–2.2 m tall, once a year you can watch flying fish there, when during spawning in spring, vimba breams jump over the waterfall. Vast Kurzeme woodlands stretch from Kuldīga.

Highlights: Ostrich-watching in the vicinity of Snēpele, Pelči Manor and its fish ponds, lovely cats of the old town of Kuldīga, leisurely walk on the banks of the Alekšupīte, refreshing bathing by the waterfall (Ventas Rumba), historic brick bridge over the river Venta in Kuldīga, Riežupa sandstone caves — a maze with the greatest total length of underground passages in Latvia, waterfalls on the river Īvande at Renda.

Abava River valley (70 km) 
Past the vineyards of the Abava valley  (Renda - Jaunmoku palace, day 94 - 96)

The Abava Valley is up to 2 km wide and about 30–40 metres deep, so hikers can enjoy beautiful landscapes. In Sabile, you can taste ciders and wines brewed in the vicinity and beyond.The territory of Pedvāle Art Park (less than 100 hectares) features meadows, shrubs, rolling slopes, deep valleys, springs, streams and a winding river. There, an artist residence is established, and exhibitions, concerts, shows are held. The symbol of the town of Kandava is the boulder bridge over the Abava. Natural meadows of the Abava Valley, particularly beautiful in the middle of summer, are sustained by livestock bred for living in the wild. In Pūre, chocolate works that offer tours and tasting are located.

Highlights: Sabile Wine Hill with a vineyard, tasting of Sabile wines and ciders, merry toboggan ride at Zviedru Cepure (the Swedish Cap), landscapes of Abava Valley, instagram-ish Fishmen Bridge over the Abava, mouth-watering Pūre chocolate truffles, exploring forest at the Forest Museum.

Tukums and Ķemeri National park (56 km) 
Ķemeri National park — among the most diverse wetlands in Latvia  (Jaunmoku palace - Bigauņciems, day 97 - 99)

The main purpose of creation of Ķemeri National Park is protection of wetlands — shallow coastal waters of the Gulf of Rīga, overgrowing coastal lakes, vast marshlands, wet forests and alluvial meadows — as an important habitat for many plant (25% of the plant species listed in the Latvian Red Book are found in the park) and animal species, especially breeding and migratory birds. One of the largest swamps of Latvia — Great Ķemeri Bog, as well as others — Zaļais purvs (Green Swamp), Raganu purvs (Witches’ Swamp) lie within the park and are passed by the winding Forest Trail. The large marshes are an important site for formation of sulphur water and medicinal mud, which was the basis for establishment of the resort of Ķemeri. Having passed the historic resort of Ķemeri, the Forest Trail meets the Baltic Coastal Hiking Route (E9) at the seaside at Bigauņciems, and both trails follow the same route towards Rīga.

Highlights: beautiful avenues of manors and palaces, charm of roses at Tukums, Šlokenbeka Manor — medieval fortified dwelling, most forest-abundant section of the Forest Trail in Kurzeme, forests rich in mushrooms and berries, raised bogs and wetlands, historical resort park of Ķemeri, mirror-like surface of Lake Slokas and the observation tower, peaceful Gulf of Rīga.

Jūrmala and Rīga (51 km) 
Latvia’s most popular resort town and capital city  (Bigauņciems - Dubulti, day 100 - 102)

This section of the Forest Trail passes through the resort town of Jūrmala and the Latvian capital city Rīga. A sandy beach runs along the coast in Jurmala, though hikers can also proceed through the downtown of Jūrmala to see Jomas iela, its main pedestrian street. The town is popular with summer holidaymakers, with many SPA hotels, cafés, live music in summer evenings. The town features unique wooden architecture of the historic summer-house area, and mansions and villas are still being built there. The forests of the coastal dunes are criss-crossed by a dense network of trails suitable for strolling and Nordic walking. The river Lielupe separates Jūrmala from the forests in the outskirts of Rīga. From Priedaine, you can reach Rīga along the roads and trails of the Kleisti forest and suburban streets leading to the Daugava; having crossed the river, you arrive at the very heart of Rīga — Rātslaukums (Town Hall Square). You can walk through Rīga and explore different areas of the city, or use public transport — a train or a bus.

Highlights: wooden architecture of Jūrmala, Ragakāpa Dune Natural Park with a wood-paved footpath, historic buildings of Ķīpsala, Old Town of Rīga — a UNESCO World Heritage Site, Art Nouveau architecture of Rīga, Rīga Central Market.

Riga and Pieriga (54 km) 

The picturesque contrast region – from towers to forests and cliffs (Old Riga - Rāmkalni, day 1 - 3)

The city of Riga is surrounded by forests, which means that if you begin your hike in the heart of the city, in a couple of hours you will find yourself in a beautiful coniferous forest. The trail leads through a wooded coastal dune area, along Gauja River and along a historical postal road which was once used to travel to neighbouring countries. In early summer, the meadows show a magnificent display of blooming catchflies.

Highlights: Old Riga – UNESCO World heritage site, Freedom Monument and Latvian National Opera House, Riga Central Market – historical aircraft (zeppelin) hangars, The cultural and natural heritage of Vērmane Garden park, Art Nouveau buildings on Tērbatas Street, The Ethnographic Open-Air Museum of Latvia, Riga water supply museum – industrial heritage, Garden of Artists by Anna Ludiņa, Inčukalns Hunting Palace, Hunting trail and Inčukalns Velnala (Devil’s) Cave.

Gauja National Park (112 km) 
Gauja valley – most impressive ancient river valley in Latvia (Rāmkalni - Valmiera, day 4 - 8)

For some 100 km, Forest trail stretches through the ancient valley of Gauja River and Gauja National Park. The banks of the Gauja River reveal colourful sandstone outcrops which are reflected in the water. The sights are most wonderful in springtime, when bird cherry trees are in full bloom, and in autumn, as the trees turn red and yellow. The ancient valley of Gauja River has a distinctive terrain relief that can fluctuate up to 80 m. The largest part of the road leads through forest paths, along the river, and exits the woods in Līgatne and Sigulda.

Highlights: The ancient valley of Gauja River – the deepest river valley in the Baltic States, Sigulda – one of the most popular tourist destinations in Latvia, Bobsleigh and Luge Track Sigulda, Sigulda cable car over river Gauja at a height of 43 m, Medieval castles of Sigulda, Krimulda, Turaida and Cēsis, Gūtmaņala Cave, the largest grotto in the Baltic States, Līgatne Nature Trails offer a chance to observe local wildlife and birds, Līgatne Paper Mill Village – industrial heritage, Secret Soviet Bunker in Skaļupes, Medieval Old Town of Cēsis, Devil’s Cave cliff, Kūķu Rock, Zvārtes Rock, Ērģeļu Cliffs and Sietiņiezis – the most impressive Devonian sandstone outcrops in Latvia, Valmiera – northern gateway to the Gauja National Park.

Northern Gauja Forestland (123 km) 
Most untouched forest region of Vidzeme (Valmiera - Trapene, day 9 - 13)

One of the least populated and most densely forested areas on Forest trail. The forests are abundant in mushrooms and berries, birds and wild animals. Here Gauja, the longest river in Latvia, curves along inland dune ranges which are covered in scarce, transparent pine forests. The land is covered in white reindeer moss which enchants the forest with a bright, sun-lit hue. Climb to the peaks of the hills to take in the panorama in its full splendour: river bends, vast meadows and ancient, majestic oak trees. Here you can see the typical Latvian landscape with individual farmsteads enclosed by forests and fields.

Highlights: Park of Senses on the bluffs of the Gauja River – trail in the trees and barefoot trail in Valmiera city, The bridge over the Gauja River next to Strenči, Strenči – a town with ancient rafter traditions, Seda – a town built in socialist urban style, featuring classical architecture of Stalin’s era, Cirgaļi inland dunes and a viewing tower, Castle of Zvārtava – a Neogothic castle built in 1881, Trapene larch alley, Kalamecu - Markūzu ravines – magnificent ravines with waterfalls and a cave-like niche.

Veclaicene Forestland (44 km) 
Most beautiful North Latvian highlands (Trapene - Korneti, day 14 - 15)

Forest trail stretches over the hillocks of Alūksne. This is one of the most difficult hiking sections, since the area is hilly. There are many glacial ravines and hills featuring panoramic views stretching all the way to Estonia and Munamägi. The highest hills are castle hills with thousands of years of history, which were purposefully selected for their high ground so that any hostile armies could be seen far away. In this section, Forest trail takes a small detour through Paganamaa or Devil’s Land in Estonia, where hikers will find a viewing tower overlooking the picturesque forest lakes. The scenery is most beautiful in spring, when dandelions are in bloom, and in autumn, as leaves turn red.

Highlights: Landscapes of Alūksne hillocks with hills and lakes, Historical centre of Ape – dolomite buildings and cobblestones, Kornetu - Peļļu subglacial bed – one of the most impressive in Latvia, Drusku castle mound and Dzērve hill watchtower, Witches’ Cliffs on the bank of the Vaidava River.

E11 in Estonia (720 km) 
The Estonian part of E11 is known as "Metsa matkarada" (“Forest Trail”). It winds through the Haanja Upland, Setomaa (Land of Setos) and along the western shore of Lake of Peipus until it reaches the Gulf of Finland in North Estonia, where it turns westwards. From there, it follows along the North-Estonian coastline and many peninsulas of Lahemaa National Park, until it comes to its end point in Tallinn. The total length of the route in Estonia is 720 km and it is divided into 4 sections: Haanja Upland, Setomaa Region, Peipsimaa Region, North Estonian Coastline. These sections are divided into ~20 km long stages with accommodation and transport options. In wooded areas, the Forest Trail leads along small forest or rural roads and trails, where possible. In order for the Forest Trail to exist as one, uninterrupted route, in some parts it runs along the side of asphalt roads. On the northern shores of Lake Peipus and in some places along the Gulf of Finland, it runs along sandy beaches or stony, rocky and sometimes overgrown shores. In cities and settlement areas, the Forest Trail leads along pedestrian sidewalks or the side of the street.

There are specific markers (white-orange-white) on trees and other objects along the route to help you get your bearings in nature and not lose track of the road. In populated areas, it is marked by stickers on road signs and other objects. On the coast of the Gulf of Finland, from Toila to Tallinn, it can also be marked by white-blue-white markers, but in places where the trail overlaps with the trails developed by the Estonian State Forests (RMK), white-green-white markers will appear. The Forest Trail can be started from any physically available location and it can be hiked in both ways (there are markers in both directions).

Haanja Upland (54 km) 
Suur Munamägi in Haanja Nature Park - the highest peak in the Baltics (Loogamäe - Vana-Vastseliina, day 16 - 18)

The best view of the 50 km wide landscape of Haanja Upland opens from the Suur Munamägi viewing tower. Suur Munamägi reaches 318 m above sea level, and it is the highest peak in the Baltic states. Forest Trail leads through minor rural roads here, along farmsteads. Forests in this region alternate with agricultural land.

Highlights: Haanja Nature Park – diverse landscapes and beautiful nature, Suur Munamägi viewing tower, Cafe at the highest peak in the Baltic states, Tradition of smoke sauna – UNESCO intangible cultural heritage, Nopri farm – local dairy producer, Vastseliina Bishop’s Castle Ruins and Pilgrim’s House, National Geographic yellow frames in the villages of Haanja and Vana-Vastseliina.

Setomaa Region (73 km) 
Setomaa – diverse nature combined with authentic culture (Vana-Vastseliina - Ristipalo, day 19 - 21)

Setomaa or “the Land of Setos” is inhabited by Setos – an ethnographic group with specific ancient traditions and a unique language dialect. Forest Trail hikers can visit the traditional Setos homestead and enjoy Setos cuisine. The forests of the region are especially charming in early autumn, when the ground is coloured lilac by the blooming heather. One of the most beautiful sections of the trail in Setomaa leads along the Piusa River, where the river is surrounded by sandstone outcrops. Located at the Värska Bay, underneath a beautiful pine forest there is Värska resort with its sanatorium and SPA which use the strengths of local nature: mineral water and lake mud. Värska mineral water is well known in Estonian and elsewhere.

Highlights: Unique culture – traditions, architecture, handicrafts, language, cuisine, Seto leelo – Seto traditional polyphonic singing, UNESCO intangible cultural heritage, Forest sites for picking wild mushrooms and berries, Valley of the Piusa River, caves and bats, Härma Walls – Estonia’s highest Devonian sandstone outcrop, Mustoja Landscape Protection Area, Seto museums in Värska, Saatse and Obinitsa, Värska mineral water and healing mud, National Geographic yellow frames in the villages of Obinitsa and Podmotsa.

Peipsimaa Region (255 km) 
Fishing villages and onion route (Ristipalo – Kuremäe, day 22 – 33)

Lake Peipus is so large that it could be mistaken for sea. Forest trail leads along the shores of the lake, passing through villages that are linked together by long streets. The streets are packed with rows of colourful houses. An influence of Orthodox culture can be sensed in the way these villages are constructed. Since the time of the Russian Emperor Tsar Nicholas, a tradition of growing onions persists in this region, and often people sell strings of home-grown onions on street sides. Visitors can buy fresh fish from Lake Peipus in shops or enjoy delicious meals served in local restaurants. As Forest trail reaches the northern shore of Lake Peipus, the route stretches along a sandy beach for two days.

Highlights: Peipus – the fourth largest lake in Europe, Kavastu Ferry – the only manually powered ferry in the Baltic states, Emajõe wetland with a wooden footpath, Varnja, Kolkja, Kallaste, Mustvee – Old Believers’ villages, where onions are traditionally grown, Fishing traditions and fish restaurants in Lake Peipus area, Alatskivi castle, Kallaste sandstone cliffs, Lake Peipus lighthouses, Avinurme handicraft centre, Sandy beach on the northern shore of Lake Peipus, Alutaguse National Park is one of the most densely wooded and swampy areas in Estonia, Kuremäe Monastery – a popular pilgrimage place.

North Estonian Coastline (344 km) 
Lahemaa National Park, waterfalls, stones and cliff (Kuremäe – Tallinn, day 34 – 50)

In the Northern Estonia section of the route, nature becomes harsher and increasingly Nordic. Here you can see the glacial boulders the size of a house, sparsely populated islands with pristine scenery, as well as waterfalls that are quite wide and tall for the Baltic region. The North Estonian Klint is a long rocky outcrop on the coast of the Baltic Sea. Walking on the shore of the Gulf of Finland a spectacular landscape of both rocky and sandy beaches may be observed. Lahemaa National Park is characterised by many bays, peninsulas, forests and villages of rich cultural heritage. Forest trail passes through the typical Estonian juniper fields and into the suburbs and the centre of Tallinn.

Highlights: The North Estonian Klint - the most impressive outcrop in the Baltics, Waterfalls and the largest boulders of Northern Europe, Industrial heritage in Kunda, Lahemaa – the oldest national park in the Baltic States, Altja – a traditional fishing village, Käsmu – a popular Estonian sea captains´ village, Purrekkari Cape – the northernmost point of the Estonian mainland, Military heritage – coastal fortifications, Pirita – the most popular resort and Olympic centre in Tallinn, Old Town of Tallinn – UNESCO heritage site.

Route notes

References

External links 
 E11 on European Ramblers Association website
 
 

Hiking trails in Germany
European long-distance paths